Santfeliuenc Fútbol Club is a Spanish football team based in Sant Feliu de Llobregat, Barcelona in the autonomous community of Catalonia. Founded in 1907, it plays in Tercera División – Group 5, holding home games at Nou Estadi Municipal de Les Grases.

History 
The club was founded on December 3, 1905.

Season to season

7 seasons in Tercera División

References

External links
Official website 
Unofficial website 
La Preferente team profile 
Soccerway team profile

Football clubs in Catalonia
Association football clubs established in 1907
1907 establishments in Catalonia